The men's 10,000 metres event at the 1963 Pan American Games was held at the Pacaembu Stadium in São Paulo on 1 May.

Results

References

Athletics at the 1963 Pan American Games
1963